Stade Municipal Bou Ali-Lahouar is a stadium in Hammam Sousse, Tunisia. It has a capacity of 6,500 spectators.  It is the home of ES Hammam-Sousse of the Tunisian Ligue Professionnelle 1.  During the 1965 Africa Cup of Nations, it hosted one match of Group B. The game was between Ghana and DR Congo. Ghana won the match 5–2.

References

Football venues in Tunisia
ES Hammam-Sousse